The 4th World Freestyle Skating Championships were held in Jeonju, South Korea from September 7 to September 9, 2010.

Medallists

References

Roller skating competitions
2010 in South Korean sport
2010 in roller sports
September 2010 sports events in South Korea